Luis L. Ramirez (June 19, 1963 – October 20, 2005) was executed by lethal injection in the U.S. state of Texas. He was convicted of hiring Edward Bell to kill the boyfriend of his former wife. He was the 15th person executed in Texas in 2005.

Crime
Ramirez and his wife, Dawn, were divorced in 1995 and two years later she began dating Nemecio Nandin, a fireman and part-time repairman of washing machines and dryers. In early April 1998, Ramirez was seen meeting with Bell. Tim Hoogstra, a paid police informant, would later testify that Bell said he had been offered $1,000 to kill Nandin. Tim Hoogstra was paid $500 to give this evidence.

On April 8, 1998 Bell called Nandin and said that he needed someone to fix his washing machine. Once at the Miles, Texas home of Bell, Nandin was led to a chicken coop, where he was handcuffed and shot once in the head with a shotgun. He was then buried in a shallow grave. Bell later fled to Tyler, Texas. The body of Nandin was discovered about three weeks later after he was reported missing when he didn't turn up for work. Bell was arrested in Tyler and business cards, maps and hand-written notes linked him to Ramirez.

Trial and appeals
Ramirez was indicted on June 4 for solicitation of capital murder. Almost a year later on May 7, 1999 he was convicted and in the separate penalty phase, sentenced to death on May 14. For his part in the crime, Bell was sentenced to life imprisonment. For the next six years his appeals to the Texas Court of Criminal Appeals, United States district courts, 5th Circuit Court of Appeals, and United States Supreme Court were denied. Ramirez was adamant up to his death of his innocence and said that there was no way he was involved in the crime. He said he was in Brady, Texas on the day of the murder. Hoogstra was also a self-admitted "daily drug abuser".

On 19 October 2005, the Texas Board of Pardons and Paroles denied a request to commute the sentence to life imprisonment. Further appeals to the United States Supreme Court were also denied. Although new evidence placed Luis Ramirez at a gas station in a different city at the time of the murder the Supreme Court denied him stating (in short) he was convicted for remuneration not for pulling the trigger.

Execution
He was pronounced dead at 6:18 p.m. CDT on October 20, 2005 in the execution chamber at the Huntsville Unit. He made no last meal request.

See also
 Capital punishment in Texas
 Capital punishment in the United States
 List of people executed in Texas, 2000–2009
 List of people executed in the United States in 2005

General references
Media Advisory from the Attorney General of Texas
https://caselaw.findlaw.com/us-5th-circuit/1425987.html
Last Statement. Texas Department of Criminal Justice. Retrieved on 2007-11-15.
Luis Ramirez. The Clark County Prosecuting Attorney. Retrieved on 2007-11-15.

1963 births
2005 deaths
American people convicted of murder
People executed for murder
21st-century executions of American people
21st-century executions by Texas
People from Texas
People executed by Texas by lethal injection
People convicted of murder by Texas